Ahmed Oudjani (19 March 1937 – 15 January 1998) was an Algerian football striker.

Biography
Oudjani was a member of the Algerian FLN team before the country gained its independence. He is also the all-time top scorer in RC Lens history, having scored 94 goals in 148 matches for the team, including 6 goals in one game against RC Paris in the 1963/1964 season. He scored 99 career goals in Ligue 1, and was the leading scorer in the 1963–64 French Division 1 with 30 goals.

Ahmed is the father of former Algerian international Chérif Oudjani, who scored the winning goal in the final of the 1990 African Cup of Nations.

Ahmed's family is of Kabyle origin, and hails from the village of Sidi Aïch in Bejaïa.

Honours
 Won the Coupe Drago three times with RC Lens in 1959, 1960 and 1965
 All-time top scorer in RC Lens history with 94 goals
 15 caps with the Algerian National Team

References

External links

Profile

1937 births
1998 deaths
Sportspeople from Skikda
Kabyle people
Association football forwards
Algerian footballers
Algerian expatriate footballers
Algeria international footballers
French footballers
RC Lens players
Racing Club de France Football players
CS Sedan Ardennes players
Stade Malherbe Caen players
Ligue 1 players
Ligue 2 players
JSM Béjaïa players
Expatriate footballers in France
Algerian expatriate sportspeople in France
FLN football team players